Martin Trainer (born April 15, 1991) is an American-French professional golfer who won his first PGA Tour event at the 2019 Puerto Rico Open, which was an alternate event.

Early life
Trainer was born in Marseille, France. He graduated from Henry M. Gunn High School in Palo Alto, California in 2009. He graduated from University of Southern California with a degree in Business Administration. His father is American and his mother French. He has dual American and French citizenship.

Nationality change
In October 2022, it was announced that Trainer had changed his sporting nationality from USA to France. Having been eligible to do so by being born in Marseille and his mother also being French. He applied to the International Golf Federation in July 2022 to switch representation.

Professional wins (4)

PGA Tour wins (1)

Web.com Tour wins (2)

PGA Tour Latinoamérica wins (1)

Results in major championships

CUT = missed the half-way cut

Results in The Players Championship

"T" indicates a tie for a place

Gallery

See also
2018 Web.com Tour Finals graduates

References

External links
 
 

American male golfers
French male golfers
USC Trojans men's golfers
PGA Tour golfers
Korn Ferry Tour graduates
Golfers from California
Gunn High School alumni
Sportspeople from Marseille
Sportspeople from Palo Alto, California
American people of French descent
1991 births
Living people